"Lala Song" is the first single taken from French record producer and DJ Bob Sinclar's sixth studio album Born in 69, released on 3 April 2009. The song samples the 1979 hit "Rapper's Delight" by the Sugarhill Gang, featuring in fact rappers Hen Dogg, Master Gee and Wonder Mike from the band.

Chart performance

Weekly charts

Year-end charts

References 

Bob Sinclar songs
2009 singles
2009 songs
Ministry of Sound singles
Songs written by Bob Sinclar
Songs written by August Darnell